Brzozowica may refer to the following places:
Brzozowica, Masovian Voivodeship (east-central Poland)
Brzozowica, Otwock County in Masovian Voivodeship (east-central Poland)
Brzozowica, West Pomeranian Voivodeship (north-west Poland)